The list of shipwrecks in June 1831 includes ships sunk, foundered, grounded, or otherwise lost during June 1831.

4 June

7 June

12 June

15 June

18 June

20 June

21 June

23 June

25 June

28 June

Unknown date

References

1831-06